Oradea Arena is a multipurpose sports arena located in Oradea, Romania. It is the home of CSM Oradea of the Liga Națională de Baschet Masculin (LNBM).

See also
 List of indoor arenas in Romania

References

External links
 Photo Gallery

2022 establishments in Romania
Sports venues completed in 2022
Music venues completed in 2022
Buildings and structures in Bihor County
Sport in Oradea
Basketball venues in Romania
Handball venues in Romania 
Indoor arenas in Romania
Music venues in Romania